Park Kil-chul (also known as Park Gil-cheol, born 19 April 1963) is a South Korean sailor. He competed in the Finn event at the 1988 Summer Olympics.

Born in Yeocheon City, Park began learning to sail in 1982 at Manseong-ri Beach. In domestic competition, he represented Yeosu City and later Yeocheon City. He won a gold medal for South Korea at the 1986 Asian Games. In later years he served variously as the head coach of the Yeosu City Hall sailing team, a vice-president of the Korea Sailing Federation, and a member of the board of directors of the Jeonnam Sailing Federation.

References

External links
 
 

1963 births
Living people
South Korean male sailors (sport)
Olympic sailors of South Korea
Sailors at the 1988 Summer Olympics – Finn
Asian Games gold medalists for South Korea
Asian Games medalists in sailing
Sailors at the 1986 Asian Games
Sailors at the 1990 Asian Games
Medalists at the 1986 Asian Games
Medalists at the 1990 Asian Games
Place of birth missing (living people)